Raneem Mohamed Yasser Saad El Din El Welily (born 1 January 1989, in Alexandria, Egypt) is a former professional squash player from Egypt. She has reached a career-high world ranking of No. 1 in September 2015. She is a three-time finalist at the World Open, in 2014, 2016, and 2019/2020. She became the World Champion in 2017, after defeating Nour El Sherbini in the finals.

Career

Junior career 
Alexandria-born El Welily has emerged as one of the most skillful players on the PSA Women's World Tour since she turned professional in 2002. Raneem followed her brother into squash at the age of six and first played for Egypt in the World Juniors 2001 in Penang, Malaysia, then aged ten.

Two years later when the event was played in Cairo she was part of the Egyptian winning squad, and in 2004 she represented the senior team that came fourth in the World Teams in Amsterdam.

The highlight of El Welily's junior career was when she became the world junior champion in Herentals, Belgium in 2005. Then she was voted WISPA Young Player of the Year for 2005 for the second time after winning it in 2004.  She lifted the World Junior Championship twice, in 2005 and 2007. Raneem also is a 6-time British Junior Open Winner.

Professional career 
El Welily  won her first senior Tour title in 2009 when she triumphed at the Heliopolis Open in Egypt.

That win helped catapult her into the world's top twenty and, after making the semi-finals of the Malaysian Open despite being a qualifier, she promptly rose into the top ten. The Egyptian shot-maker doubled her Tour title tally in 2011 and four months later won the biggest event of her career so far, by topping then-World No.2 Jenny Duncalf to lift the prestigious Carol Weymuller Open.

2012 saw El Welily reach World No.2 for the first time and in September of that year she won her first World Series title by defeating World No.1 Nicol David in the final in the CIMB Malaysian Open. Also in 2012, she was part of the team that regained the world team title after winning a gold medal at the 2012 Women's World Team Squash Championships; this was her second world team title success.

She beat David again in the 2013 Cleveland Classic final to lift another crown. El Welily amassed three runner-up spots in the remainder of 2013, with David winning all three, before she won her second Malaysian Open title in 2014, beating Nour El Tayeb in the final.

In 2014, she was part of the Egyptian team that won the bronze medal at the 2014 Women's World Team Squash Championships.

She reached the final of the World Championship in December 2014 but David proved to be a stumbling block once more as she denied El Welily squash's biggest crown. Undeterred, El Welily had a terrific opening to 2015 as she won the Tournament of Champions, the Windy City Open and the Alexandria International to close the gap on David's hold on the World No.1 ranking. In May 2015 she was named as the PSA Women's Player of the year for the 2014/15 season. In September 2015, Raneem surpassed David to clinch the World No.1 ranking in the PSA Women's World Ranking.

In 2016, she won her third world team title as part of the Egyptian team that won the gold medal at the 2016 Women's World Team Squash Championships. In 2018, she was part of the Egyptian team that won the 2018 Women's World Team Squash Championships, It was her fourth world team title.

El Welily announced her retirement from professional competition in June 2020.

Personal life
El Welily was born and raised in Alexandria. She is married to Tarek Momen, a professional squash player. She graduated from the German School in Alexandria and between training sessions she also finds time to indulge her interests of music, jigsaw puzzles, and sudoku.

Titles (24)

World Open

Finals: 4 (1 title, 3 runners-up)

See also
 Official Women's Squash World Ranking
 WISPA Awards

References

External links
 
 
 

1989 births
Living people
Egyptian female squash players
Sportspeople from Alexandria
21st-century Egyptian women